Biscoe may refer to:

People
 Biscoe (surname)

School
 Tyndale Biscoe School, CMS Tyndale Biscoe Memorial High School in Srinagar India

Places
Antarctica
 Biscoe Bay
 Biscoe Point
 Biscoe Islands
 Mount Biscoe
 Biscoe Sea, an historical map entry for the area of Lazarev Sea
USA
 Biscoe, North Carolina
 Fredonia (Biscoe), Arkansas
 Biscoe, Virginia

Ships
 The RRS John Biscoe, a former British Antarctic Survey supply and research ship.

See also
 Bisco (disambiguation)
 Bisko